Bradyrhizobium manausense is a bacterium from the genus of Bradyrhizobium which has been isolated from the nodules from the plant Vigna unguiculata from the Amazon rainforest.

References

Nitrobacteraceae
Bacteria described in 2014